The Assumption of the Virgin Cathedral is a Renaissance-style, Roman Catholic cathedral located in Santa María Square, opposite the Town Hall and the Episcopal Palace, in the center of Jaén, region of Andalusia, Spain.

The current cathedral was conceived in the 16th century to replace a previous 15th century Gothic edifice. Construction lasted for several centuries, with the original idea maintained. Of significance are the chapter house and sacristy, masterpieces of Andrés de Vandelvira and important examples of the Spanish Renaissance; the façade, built in the Baroque style with sculptures by Pedro Roldán; and the choir, built in the Neoclassical style and known as one of the largest in Spain.

Kept in the cathedral is a copy of the Veil of Veronica which probably dates from the 14th century, and originated in Siena. Acquired by Bishop Nicolás de Biedma, it is publicly displayed to the people every year on Good Friday and the Feast of the Assumption, as well as in a side chapel every Friday.

History
The site was once occupied by a mosque, which was reconsecrated as a church dedicated to the Assumption after Ferdinand III of Castile took Jaén in 1246. It was damaged and rebuilt on numerous occasions since until the 16th century, when the current edifice began construction.

Several architects were involved in building the cathedral, Andrés de Vandelvira being the most important one. The distinctive façade, designed by Eufrasio López de Rojas, only began construction in 1660, after the cathedral itself was already consecrated; further works involving interior decoration and the chapels would only conclude in 1724. In addition, consolidation works were necessary to the north façade after the Lisbon earthquake of 1755, which also led to the construction of the Sagrario there.

The young Francisco Guerrero was the maestro de capilla of Jaén Cathedral around 1545.

In 2008, the procedure for the cathedral of Jaén to be declared a World Heritage Site, considering that it served as a model for the construction of other cathedrals in Spain and the Americas. On 27 January 2012 the «Jaén Cathedral (extension of the Renaissance monumental complex of Úbeda and Baeza)» was inscribed on the Spanish Indicative List of World Heritage Sites, in the category of cultural property (No. ref 5667).

Church of the Sagrario 

 
The Church of the Sagrario is a building attached to the north facade of the cathedral, made due to the unevenness and damage caused by the Lisbon earthquake of 1755. The project for this work was designed by the Madrid architect Ventura Rodríguez in 1764 and executed by his nephew Manuel Martín Rodríguez. It was consecrated on March 22, 1801.

References

Bibliography 
 
 

 

 

 

 

 
 

 

 
 

 

 

 

 
 
 

 

 

16th-century Roman Catholic church buildings in Spain
Conversion of non-Christian religious buildings and structures into churches
Renaissance architecture in Andalusia
Roman Catholic cathedrals in Andalusia
Roman Catholic churches in Andalusia
Former mosques in Spain
Buildings and structures in Jaén, Spain